Beam steering is a technique for changing the direction of the main lobe of a radiation pattern.

In radio and radar systems, beam steering may be accomplished by switching the antenna elements or by changing the relative phases of the RF signals driving the elements. In recent days, the beam steering is playing significant role in 5G communication because of quasi-optic nature of 5G frequencies.

In acoustics, beam steering is used to direct the audio from loudspeakers to a specific location in the listening area. This is done by changing the magnitude and phase of two or more loudspeakers installed in a column where the combined sound is added and cancelled at the required position. Commercially, this type of loudspeaker arrangement is known as a line array. This technique has been around for many years but since the emergence of modern digital signal processing (DSP) technology there are now many commercially available products on the market. Beam steering and directivity Control using DSP was pioneered in the early 1990s by Duran Audio who launched a technology called DDC (Digital Directivity Control).

In optical systems, beam steering may be accomplished by changing the refractive index of the medium through which the beam is transmitted or by the use of mirrors, prisms, lenses, or rotating diffraction gratings.  Examples of optical beam steering approaches include mechanical mirror-based gimbals or beam-director units, galvanometer mechanisms that rotate mirrors, Risley prisms, phased-array optics, and microelectromechanical systems using micro-mirrors.

Source: from Federal Standard 1037C

See also 
 Beamforming
 Electron optics

References

External links 
Animation of beam steering using phased arrays on YouTube
 Duran Audio's Digital Directivity Control Technology
 Design of Cost-Effective Beam Steered Phased Array Antenna with Enhanced Gain using Metamaterial Lens

Antennas